Van der Voort is a Dutch toponymic surname meaning "from the ford" (fordable place). Notable people with the surname include:

Colin van der Voort (born 1965), Australian rugby league footballer
Cornelis van der Voort (1576–1624), Dutch portrait painter
Dolf van der Voort van Zijp (1892–1978), Dutch horse rider 
Michael Pauluzen Van der Voort (c. 1615–1690), Flemish early resident of New Amsterdam
Michiel van der Voort the Elder (1667–1737), Flemish sculptor
Peter van der Voort (born 1964), Dutch physician, professor, and politician
Vincent van der Voort (born 1975), Dutch darts player
Wim van der Voort (born 1923), Dutch speed skater

See also
Vandervoort (disambiguation)
Vervoort

References

Dutch-language surnames
Surnames of Dutch origin